The Lycoming O-480 is a family of six-cylinder, horizontally opposed fixed-wing aircraft engines of 479.6 cubic inch (7.86 L) displacement, made by Lycoming Engines. The engine is a six-cylinder version of the four-cylinder Lycoming O-320.

Design and development
O-480 series engines are installed on a number of different aircraft types. Their main competitive engines are the Continental IO-520 and IO-550 series.

Variants
All engines have an additional prefix preceding the 480 to indicate the specific configuration of the engine. Although the series is known as the "O-480", there are only geared engines in the series. There are also numerous engine suffixes, denoting different accessories such as different manufacturers' carburetors, or different magnetos.

GO-480
Normally aspirated Opposed engine, equipped with a carburetor and Gearbox at the front end of the crankshaft to drive the propeller at a lower RPM than the engine.

GSO-480
Supercharger driven by the engine, gearbox to drive propeller, and equipped with a carburetor. Designated the O-480-1 by the US military.

IGSO-480 
Supercharger driven by the engine, gearbox to drive propeller, with fuel Injection. Designated the O-480-3 by the US military.

IGO-480 
Gearbox to drive propeller, normally aspirated with fuel injection.

Applications
 Aero Commander 560, 560A, 560E and 680, 680E and the pressurized 720 Alti-Cruiser.
 Aermacchi AM3CM (Bosbok)
 Beechcraft Twin Bonanza 
 Beechcraft Queen Air 
 Dornier Do 27
 Helio Courier
 Soko J-20 Kraguj
 Temco 58
 Utva 66

Specifications (GSO-480-A1A6)

See also

References

O-480
1950s aircraft piston engines
Boxer engines